The Canton of Forges-les-Eaux is a former canton situated in the Seine-Maritime département and in the Haute-Normandie region of northern France. It was disbanded following the French canton reorganisation which came into effect in March 2015. It consisted of 21 communes, which joined the canton of Gournay-en-Bray in 2015. It had a total of 10,991 inhabitants (2012).

Geography 
An area of farming and light industry in the arrondissement of Dieppe, centred on the town of Forges-les-Eaux. The altitude varies from 101m (Mesnil-Mauger) to 246m (Gaillefontaine) for an average altitude of 170m.

The canton comprised 21 communes:

Beaubec-la-Rosière
Beaussault
La Bellière
Compainville
La Ferté-Saint-Samson
Forges-les-Eaux
Le Fossé
Gaillefontaine
Grumesnil
Haucourt
Haussez
Longmesnil
Mauquenchy
Mesnil-Mauger
Pommereux
Roncherolles-en-Bray
Rouvray-Catillon
Saint-Michel-d'Halescourt
Saumont-la-Poterie
Serqueux
Le Thil-Riberpré

Population

See also 
 Arrondissements of the Seine-Maritime department
 Cantons of the Seine-Maritime department
 Communes of the Seine-Maritime department

References

Forges-les-Eaux
2015 disestablishments in France
States and territories disestablished in 2015